Habrocestum is a genus of jumping spiders first described in 1876. They mostly occur in Eurasia and Africa, though one species has been found in Australia and another on the Solomon Islands.

Species
, the World Spider Catalog accepted the following species:

 Habrocestum africanum Wesołowska & Haddad, 2009 – South Africa
 Habrocestum albimanum Simon, 1901 – South Africa
 Habrocestum albopunctatum Wesołowska & van Harten, 2002 – Socotra
 Habrocestum algericum Dalmas, 1920 – Algeria
 Habrocestum arabicum Prószynski, 1989 – Saudi Arabia
 Habrocestum auricomum Haddad & Wesołowska, 2013 – South Africa
 Habrocestum bovaei (Lucas, 1846) – Morocco, Algeria, Spain
 Habrocestum dubium Wesołowska & van Harten, 2002 – Socotra
 Habrocestum egaeum Metzner, 1999 – Greece, Crete, Turkey
 Habrocestum ferrugineum Wesołowska & van Harten, 2002 – Socotra
 Habrocestum flavimanum Simon, 1901 – South Africa
 Habrocestum formosum Wesołowska, 2000 – Zimbabwe
 Habrocestum gibbosum Wesołowska & van Harten, 2007 – Yemen
 Habrocestum graecum Dalmas, 1920 – Greece
 Habrocestum hantaneensis Kanesharatnam & Benjamin, 2016 – Sri Lanka
 Habrocestum hongkongiense Prószynski, 1992 – Hong Kong
 Habrocestum ibericum Dalmas, 1920 – Spain
 Habrocestum ignorabile Wesołowska & van Harten, 2007 – Yemen
 Habrocestum inquinatum Wesołowska & van Harten, 2002 – Yemen, Socotra
 Habrocestum kodigalaensis Kanesharatnam & Benjamin, 2016 – Sri Lanka
 Habrocestum latifasciatum (Simon, 1868) – Eastern Mediterranean to Near East
 Habrocestum laurae Peckham & Peckham, 1903 – South Africa
 Habrocestum lepidum Dalmas, 1920 – Algeria
 Habrocestum longispinum Sankaran, Malamel, Joseph & Sebastian, 2019 – India
 Habrocestum luculentum Peckham & Peckham, 1903 – South Africa
 Habrocestum naivasha Dawidowicz & Wesołowska, 2016 – Kenya
 Habrocestum namibicum Wesołowska, 2006 – Namibia
 Habrocestum nigristernum Dalmas, 1920 – Turkey
 Habrocestum ohiyaensis Kanesharatnam & Benjamin, 2016 – Sri Lanka
 Habrocestum ornaticeps (Simon, 1868) – Morocco, Spain
 Habrocestum panjabium Roewer, 1951 – Pakistan
 Habrocestum papilionaceum (L. Koch, 1867) – Greece, Turkey
 Habrocestum peckhami Rainbow, 1899 – Solomon Is.
 Habrocestum penicillatum Caporiacco, 1940 – Ethiopia
 Habrocestum personatum Wesołowska & A. Russell-Smith, 2011 – Nigeria
 Habrocestum pullatum Simon, 1876 – France
 Habrocestum punctiventre Keyserling, 1882 – Western Australia
 Habrocestum sapiens (Peckham & Peckham, 1903) – Southern Africa
 Habrocestum schinzi Simon, 1887 – South Africa
 Habrocestum shulovi Prószyński, 2000 – Turkey, Israel
 Habrocestum simoni Dalmas, 1920 – Algeria
 Habrocestum socotrense Wesołowska & van Harten, 2002 – Socotra
 Habrocestum speciosum Wesołowska & van Harten, 1994 – Socotra
 Habrocestum subdotatum Caporiacco, 1940 – Ethiopia, East Africa
 Habrocestum subpenicillatum Caporiacco, 1941 – Ethiopia
 Habrocestum superbum Wesołowska, 2000 – Zimbabwe
 Habrocestum tanzanicum Wesołowska & Russell-Smith, 2000 – Tanzania
 Habrocestum verattii Caporiacco, 1936 – Libya
 Habrocestum virginale Wesołowska & van Harten, 2007 – Yemen

References

External links
 Photograph of Habrocestum sp. (?)
 Photograph of H. albopunctatum
 Photograph of H. graecum

Salticidae
Salticidae genera
Spiders of Asia
Spiders of Africa
Spiders of Australia